Hungary competed at the 1960 Summer Olympics in Rome, Italy. 184 competitors, 157 men and 27 women, took part in 107 events in 18 sports.

Medalists

Gold

 Rudolf Kárpáti — Fencing, Men's Sabre individual
 Ferenc Németh — Modern pentathlon, Men's Individual Competition
 János Parti — Canoe racing, Men's C-1 1000 metres
 Gyula Török — Boxing, Flyweight
 András Balczó, Imre Nagy, Ferenc Németh — Modern pentathlon, Men's Team Competition
 Gábor Delneky, Aladár Gerevich, Zoltán Horváth, Rudolf Kárpáti, Pál Kovács, Tamás Mendelényi — Fencing, Men's Sabre Team

Silver
 Zoltán Horváth — Fencing, Men's Sabre individual
 Imre Nagy — Modern pentathlon, Men's Individual Competition
 Imre Polyák — Wrestling, Featherweight
 Imre Szöllősi — Canoe racing, Men's K-1 1000 metres
 Gyula Zsivótzky — Athletics, Men's Hammer throw
 György Mészáros, András Szente — Canoe racing, Men's K-2 1000 metres
 Imre Kemeczei, György Mészáros, András Szente, Imre Szöllősi — Canoe racing, Men's K-1 4x500 metres
 Lídia Dömölky, Katalin Juhász, Györgyi Marvalits, Magda Nyári, Ildikó Rejtő — Fencing, Women's Team foil

Bronze
 Gergely Kulcsár — Athletics, Men's Javelin throw
 István Rózsavölgyi — Athletics, Men's 1500 metres
 Győző Veres — Weightlifting, Middleweight
 Imre Farkas, András Törő — Canoe racing, Men's C-2 1000 metres
 Klára Fried-Bánfalvi, Vilma Egresi — Canoe racing, Women's K-2 500 metres
 Flórián Albert, Jenő Dalnoki, Zoltán Dudás, János Dunai, Lajos Faragó, János Göröcs, Ferenc Kovács, Dezső Novák, Pál Orosz, Tibor Pál, Gyula Rákosi, Imre Sátori, Ernő Solymosi, Gábor Török, Pál Várhidi and Oszkár Vilezsál — Football (soccer), men's team competition
 Kálmán Markovits, András Katona, György Kárpáti, László Jeney, Otto Boros, István Hevesi, Mihály Mayer, Zoltán Dömötör, Dezső Gyarmati, Tivadar Kanizsa and Péter Rusorán — Water polo, men's team competition

Athletics

Basketball

Boxing

Canoeing

Cycling

Five male cyclists represented Hungary in 1960.

Individual road race
 Ferenc Stámusz
 János Dévai
 Ferenc Horváth
 Győző Török

1000m time trial
 János Söre

Diving

Equestrian

Fencing

21 fencers, 16 men and 5 women, represented Hungary in 1960.

Men's foil
 Mihály Fülöp
 Jenő Kamuti
 László Kamuti

Men's team foil
 Ferenc Czvikovszki, Jenő Kamuti, Mihály Fülöp, László Kamuti, József Gyuricza, József Sákovics

Men's épée
 József Sákovics
 István Kausz
 Tamás Gábor

Men's team épée
 József Marosi, Tamás Gábor, István Kausz, József Sákovics, Árpád Bárány

Men's sabre
 Rudolf Kárpáti
 Zoltán Horváth
 Aladár Gerevich

Men's team sabre
 Aladár Gerevich, Rudolf Kárpáti, Pál Kovács, Zoltán Horváth, Gábor Delneky, Tamás Mendelényi

Women's foil
 Magda Nyári-Kovács
 Ildikó Ságiné Ujlakyné Rejtő
 Lídia Sákovicsné Dömölky

Women's team foil
 Ildikó Ságiné Ujlakyné Rejtő, Györgyi Marvalics-Székely, Magda Nyári-Kovács, Katalin Nagyné Juhász, Lídia Sákovicsné Dömölky

Football

Gymnastics

Modern pentathlon

Three male pentathletes represented Hungary in 1960. The team won gold and Ferenc Németh won an individual gold and Imre Nagy won silver.

Individual
 Ferenc Németh
 Imre Nagy
 András Balczó

Team
 Ferenc Németh
 Imre Nagy
 András Balczó

Rowing

Hungary had nine male rowers participate in three out of seven rowing events in 1960.

 Men's coxed pair
 Pál Wágner
 László Munteán
 Gyula Lengyel (cox)

 Men's coxless four
 Lajos Kiss
 György Sarlós
 József Sátori
 Béla Zsitnik

 Men's coxed four
 Tibor Bedekovits
 Csaba Kovács
 László Munteán
 Pál Wágner
 Gyula Lengyel (cox)

Sailing

Shooting

Ten shooters represented Hungary in 1960.

25 m pistol
 Ferenc Kun
 József Gyönyörű

50 m pistol
 Ambrus Balogh

300 m rifle, three positions
 Sándor Krebs
 Miklós Szabó

50 m rifle, three positions
 János Holup
 Imre Simkó

50 m rifle, prone
 János Dosztály
 Imre Simkó

Trap
 Ede Szomjas
 Károly Kulin-Nagy

Swimming

Water polo

Weightlifting

Wrestling

References

External links
Official Olympic Reports
International Olympic Committee results database

Nations at the 1960 Summer Olympics
1960
Olympics